Mount Zion United Methodist Church, is a historic African American Church located at 8537 Main Street in Ellicott City, Maryland.

The building was constructed in 1874.

See also
Asbury Methodist Episcopal Church (Annapolis Junction, Maryland)
Mt. Moriah Lodge No. 7

References

African-American history of Howard County, Maryland
Howard County, Maryland landmarks
Churches in Ellicott City, Maryland